Lypovets is a town in  Vinnytsia Raion of Vinnytsia Oblast, Ukraine. Until the Administrative reform of 2020 it served as the administrative center of Lypovets Raion now disestablished. Population:

History 
It was the administrative center of Lypovets uyezd in Kiev Governorate of the Russian Empire.

During World War II, Lypovets was occupied by Nazi German troops, from 1941, to 1944. As a result of this occupation, Lypovets was the site of a battle between the Soviet Union and the Slovak State. The battle ended with a Slovak victory, with a cumulative casualty count of nearly 700.

In January 1989 the population was 9764 people

In January 2013 the population was 8727 people.

Gallery

Notable people 
 Pyotr Stolyarsky (1871 –  1944), Soviet violinist and pedagogue

References

External links
 Website «Наш Липовець»
 The murder of the Jews of Lypovets during World War II, at Yad Vashem website.

Cities in Vinnytsia Oblast
Lipovetsky Uyezd
Cities of district significance in Ukraine
Holocaust locations in Ukraine